Star Trek: Tactical Assault is a Star Trek video game for the Nintendo DS and PlayStation Portable that was developed by Quicksilver Software, also the creators of Star Trek: Starfleet Command.  The game is published by Bethesda Softworks, which published several other Star Trek games around that time.  This would be the first game on a Nintendo platform to be published by Bethesda since the NES version of Home Alone in 1991.

Gameplay

Single-player
There are two playable campaigns, each covering a range of missions. The Starfleet campaign is set in 2284 and predates the events of Star Trek II: The Wrath of Khan. The player follows the adventures of Lieutenant Commander Reynolds, completing missions and working up to better ships, from a small frigate to a Constitution-class starship and beyond. The Klingon campaign is set after the Khitomer Massacre of 2346.

In the single-player game, the Constitution- and Miranda-class Federation ships are playable, as well as the Klingon D7 and Bird of Prey. There is also a new Starfleet ship, designated as a dreadnought, with three nacelles and a body style similar to the Miranda class.

In campaign mode, strategy is used on battle, dialogs, and decisions. Depending your actions, you'll be awarded with a bronze, silver, or gold medal and 1, 2, or 3 upgrade points, respectively.

Multiplayer
Both handheld versions offer head-to-head battles between two players. There are roughly twenty playable ships from among five factions: Federation, Klingon, Romulan, Gorn, and Orion.  The Nintendo DS version requires both players to own a copy of the game to compete in its multiplayer mode, which does not utilize online connectivity of any kind.

Development
The game was announced in January 2006 when Bethesda acquired the rights to the Star Trek series of video games.

Reception

The game received "mixed" reviews on both platforms according to the review aggregation website Metacritic.

References

External links
 

2006 video games
Bethesda Softworks games
Multiplayer and single-player video games
Nintendo DS games
PlayStation Portable games
Quicksilver Software games
Real-time tactics video games
Tactical Assault
Ubisoft games
Tactical Assault
Video games developed in the United States
Video games scored by Jason Graves
Video games scored by Rod Abernethy